Lake Aircraft was a manufacturer of amphibious aircraft. Its factory was in Sanford, Maine, United States, and its sales offices were located at Laconia / Gilford, New Hampshire and Kissimmee, Florida.

The assets are currently owned by Revo Inc, owned by Armand Rivard, although the company was put up for sale again in August 2018.

History 
In January 2009 company owner Armand Rivard indicated that he intended to sell the company and retire. The company had previously been offered for sale in 2001, 2002, via auction in 2005 and in 2007. Lake Aircraft produced one aircraft in 2007 and none in 2008, but continues to make parts for existing aircraft. In 2009 the company employed six people, down from the 200 employees that it had in the 1980s. In August 2018 the company was once again offered for sale, including all the LA-4 tooling, type certificate and the designs.

Aircraft

References

External links

Defunct aircraft manufacturers of the United States
Manufacturing companies established in 1946